Below are the rosters for the 1993 World Junior Ice Hockey Championships held in Sweden.

Canada
Coach: Perry Pearn

References

World Junior Ice Hockey Championships
World Junior Ice Hockey Championships rosters